SIFE UFE (Students In Free Enterprise Université Française d'Egypte) is the name for the SIFE team at the French University of Egypt (UFE). It works with Egyptian leaders in business and the Ministry of Education to make a difference in its communities while developing the skills to become socially responsible business leaders.

Projects
Among the projects SIFE UFE presented in the national and World Cup competitions:

El-Warraq Island community
 MicroBusiness
 El-Warraq Women Development Program
 WIFE (Women In Free Entreprise)
 Sew Far Sew Good
 Loom Weaving project
 Don Bosco
 Sailing Hope
 BioLife Program
 Phase 1: Biogas Units
 BioBakery
 Re-Warraq
 The Core
 Mix-it-All

El-Azbakeya community
 AzaBook
 Nabi Daniel (a similar program in Alexandria)

El-Bahariya Oasis community
 El-Wahat project

El-Zabbaleen community
 Few2C (Food Entrapped Waste 'to' Compost)

El-Galatma Village community
 Purigation

Egyptian general issues
 Rice Straw project

El-Mayyana Village community
 Purigation

El-Manzala lake community
 Aqua Farming

External links
 SIFE UFE Homepage
 SIFE Egypt Homepage
 SIFE Homepage
 SIFE World Cup Homepage

Non-profit organisations based in Egypt
Student organizations established in 2006
Universities in Egypt
2006 establishments in Egypt